This list of mammals of Estonia shows the IUCN Red List status of the mammal fauna occurring in Estonia. It is somewhat impoverished compared to that of southern and central Europe due to the short period since the last ice age. Native species are considered to be those which are today present in the country. There are no endemic mammal species in Estonia. The list follows Moks et al. (2015) with later additions.

The following tags are used to highlight each species' conservation status as assessed on the IUCN Red List published by the International Union for Conservation of Nature:

Order: Eulipotyphla (shrews, hedgehogs, gymnures, moles and solenodons) 

Eulipotyphlans are insectivorous mammals. Shrews and solenodons resemble mice, hedgehogs carry spines, gymnures look more like large rats, while moles are stout-bodied burrowers.

Family: Erinaceidae (hedgehogs)
Subfamily: Erinaceinae
Genus: Erinaceus
 West European hedgehog, E. europaeus LC
 Northern white-breasted hedgehog, E. roumanicus LC

Family: Soricidae (shrews)
Subfamily: Soricinae
Tribe: Nectogalini
Genus: Neomys
 Eurasian water shrew, Neomys fodiens LC
 Mediterranean water shrew, Neomys anomalus LC
Tribe: Soricini
Genus: Sorex
 Common shrew, Sorex araneus LC
 Laxmann's shrew, Sorex caecutiens LC
 Eurasian pygmy shrew, Sorex minutus LC
 Eurasian least shrew, Sorex minutissimus LC (one uncertain finding from 1971)
Family: Talpidae (moles)
Subfamily: Talpinae
Tribe: Talpini
Genus: Talpa
 European mole, Talpa europaea LC

Order: Chiroptera (bats) 

The bats' most distinguishing feature is that their forelimbs are developed as wings, making them the only mammals capable of flight. Bat species account for about 20% of all mammals.
Family: Vespertilionidae
Subfamily: Myotinae
Genus: Myotis
 Brandt's bat, Myotis brandti LC
 Pond bat, Myotis dasycneme VU
 Daubenton's bat, Myotis daubentonii LC
 Whiskered bat, Myotis mystacinus LC
 Natterer's bat, Myotis nattereri LC
Subfamily: Vespertilioninae
Genus: Barbastella
Western barbastelle, B. barbastellus   (unproven)
Genus: Eptesicus
 Northern bat, Eptesicus nilssoni LC
Genus: Nyctalus
 Common noctule, Nyctalus noctula LC
Genus: Pipistrellus
 Nathusius' pipistrelle, Pipistrellus nathusii LC
 Common pipistrelle, Pipistrellus pipistrellus LC
 Soprano pipistrelle, Pipistrellus pygmaeus LC
Genus: Plecotus
Brown long-eared bat, P. auritus 
Genus: Vespertilio
 Parti-coloured bat, Vespertilio murinus LC

Order: Lagomorpha (lagomorphs) 

The lagomorphs comprise two families, Leporidae (hares and rabbits), and Ochotonidae (pikas). Though they can resemble rodents, and were classified as a superfamily in that order until the early twentieth century, they have since been considered a separate order. They differ from rodents in a number of physical characteristics, such as having four incisors in the upper jaw rather than two.

Family: Leporidae (rabbits, hares)
Genus: Lepus
European hare, L. europaeus 
Mountain hare, L. timidus

Order: Rodentia (rodents) 

Rodents make up the largest order of mammals, with over 40% of mammalian species. They have two incisors in the upper and lower jaw which grow continually and must be kept short by gnawing.

Suborder: Sciurognathi
Family: Castoridae (beavers)
Genus: Castor
 Eurasian beaver, C. fiber 
Family: Sciuridae (squirrels)
Subfamily: Sciurinae
Tribe: Sciurini
Genus: Sciurus
 Red squirrel, S. vulgaris LC
Tribe: Pteromyini
Genus: Pteromys
 Siberian flying squirrel, P. volans NT
Family: Gliridae (dormice)
Subfamily: Leithiinae
Genus: Eliomys
 Garden dormouse, Eliomys quercinus VU (last sighted in 1986)
Genus: Muscardinus
 Hazel dormouse, Muscardinus avellanarius NT (last sighted in 1986)
Family: Dipodidae (jerboas)
Subfamily: Sicistinae
Genus: Sicista
 Northern birch mouse, Sicista betulina NT
Family: Cricetidae
Subfamily: Arvicolinae
Genus: Arvicola
 European water vole or north-western water vole, Arvicola amphibius LC
Genus: Clethrionomys
 Bank vole, Myodes glareolus or Clethrionomys glareolus LC
Genus: Microtus
 Field vole, Microtus agrestis LC
 Common vole, Microtus arvalis LC
 Root vole, Microtus oeconomus LC (one lower jaw found in 1970) 
 Sibling vole, Microtus levis LC
 European pine vole, Microtus subterraneus LC
Genus: Myopus
 Wood lemming, Myopus schisticolor LC (first found in 2019)
Genus: Ondatra
Muskrat, Ondatra zibethicus LC (introduced) 
Family: Muridae (mice, rats, voles, gerbils, hamsters, etc.)
Subfamily: Murinae
Genus: Apodemus
 Striped field mouse, Apodemus agrarius LC
 Yellow-necked mouse, Apodemus flavicollis LC
 Ural field mouse, Apodemus uralensis LC
Genus: Micromys
 Harvest mouse, Micromys minutus NT
Genus: Rattus
Brown rat, Rattus norvegicus LC
Black rat, Rattus rattus LC
Genus: Mus
House mouse, Mus musculus LC

Order: Carnivora (carnivorans) 

There are over 260 species of carnivorans, the majority of which feed primarily on meat. They have a characteristic skull shape and dentition.
Suborder: Feliformia
Family: Felidae (cats)
Subfamily: Felinae
Genus: Lynx
 Eurasian lynx, L. lynx LC
Suborder: Caniformia
Family: Canidae (dogs, foxes)
Genus: Canis
 Gray wolf, C. lupus LC
 Golden jackal, C. aureus LC (first found in 2013)
Genus: Nyctereutes
Raccoon dog, N. procyonoides LC (introduced)
Genus: Vulpes
 Red fox, V. vulpes LC
Family: Ursidae (bears)
Genus: Ursus
 Brown bear, U. arctos LC
Family: Mustelidae (mustelids)
Genus: Gulo
Wolverine, G. gulo LC (only five proven sightings during the 20th century and none during the 21st)
Genus: Lutra
 European otter, L. lutra NT
Genus: Martes
Pine marten, M. martes LC
Beech marten, M. foina LC
Genus: Meles
 European badger, M. meles LC
Genus: Mustela
 Stoat, M. erminea LC
 European mink, M. lutreola CR reintroduced
 Least weasel, M. nivalis LC
 European polecat, M. putorius LC
Genus: Neogale
American mink, N. vison  introduced
Family: Phocidae (pinnipeds especially earless seals)
Genus: Halichoerus
 Grey seal, H. grypus LC
Genus: Pusa
 Ringed seal, P. hispida LC

Order: Cetacea (whales) 

The order Cetacea includes whales, dolphins and porpoises. They are the mammals most fully adapted to aquatic life with a spindle-shaped nearly hairless body, protected by a thick layer of blubber, and forelimbs and tail modified to provide propulsion underwater.

Suborder: Odontoceti
Family: Phocoenidae (porpoises)
Genus: Phocoena
 Harbour porpoise, Phocoena phocoena VU (last proven sighting in 1988)
Family: Monodontidae (narwhals)
Genus: Delphinapterus
 Beluga, Delphinapterus leucas VU (last sighted in 1985)
Family: Delphinidae (marine dolphins)
Genus: Lagenorhynchus
 White-beaked dolphin, Lagenorhynchus albirostris LC (sighted once in 2008)
Genus: Tursiops
 Bottlenose dolphin, Tursiops truncatus <span style="color:#cccccc;">DD </span style">(sighted once in 2020 and maybe also in 2015)

Order: Artiodactyla (even-toed ungulates) 

The even-toed ungulates are ungulates whose weight is borne about equally by the third and fourth toes, rather than mostly or entirely by the third as in perissodactyls. There are about 220 artiodactyl species, including many that are of great economic importance to humans.

Family: Suidae (pigs)
Subfamily: Suinae
Genus: Sus
 Wild boar, S. scrofa LC
Family: Cervidae (deer)
Subfamily: Cervinae
Genus: Cervus
 Red deer, C. elaphus LC
 Sika deer, C. nippon LC (introduced, few sightings in 1980s and more often since 2013)
Genus: Dama
 European fallow deer, D. dama LC (introduced, few sightings since 2012)
Subfamily: Capreolinae
Genus: Alces
 Moose, A. alces LC
Genus: Capreolus
 Roe deer, C. capreolus LC

See also
Fauna of Estonia
List of chordate orders
Lists of mammals by region
List of prehistoric mammals
Mammal classification
List of mammals described in the 2000s

External links
Eesti imetajate levikuatlas

References

Mammals
Estonia
Mammals
Estonia